Nick Ahrens (born November 11, 1983, in Minneapolis) is an American designer and art director. He is a partner in iam8bit, a production company, marketing boutique and artist collective, along with Jon M. Gibson, Amanda White and Taylor Harrington.

Career

After a career in professional snowskating, Ahrens held a position at Game Informer magazine for six years. He helped oversee the reinvention of the publication's digital presence, which won a "People's Voice Award" Webby Award in 2010. Ahrens also served as the magazine's Media Editor, where he wrote and curated the monthly "Gear" section, as well as writing regular videogame reviews and previews. He also regularly took on design and photography duties for both the magazine and website.

Ahrens joined iam8bit in October 2010, and is currently a partner and art director.

Books
 SUPER iam8bit: More Art Inspired by Classic Videogames of the 80s (2011), a follow-up collection of the iam8bit exhibition's best pieces from the years 2006–2010. Foreword by Kevin Pereira. Co-authored with Jon M. Gibson, Amanda White and Taylor Harrington.

References

External links 
iam8bit official homepage

American art directors
American magazine journalists
Living people
1983 births